The Washington Power are a professional inline hockey team based in Laurel, Maryland. They are members of Major League Roller Hockey. Part of the rebirth of MLRH, the Power were the first American announced for the 2009 MLRH season.

Franchise history
The Washington Power were founded as one of MLRH's charter franchises. Beginning play in 1998, the Power made their debut on June 14, 1998, losing 12-6 in their first home game to the New York Rockers. They won their first game two weeks later, defeating the Toronto Torpedoes at home, 9-8. Dan Scardino was the Power's top goal scorer that first season with a total of 25 goals. The Power were able to receive a playoff berth in their inaugural season with a 9-11-0 record tailing 18 points. Playoff success did come quickly, as the Power defeated the New York Rockers 15-4 at home. Their glory was short lived as they were defeated by the undefeated Anaheim Bullfrogs in the Coastal Division Finals 20-4 just four days later. The Power would fold after just one season of play.

It was announced on May 29, 2008 that the Power would be returning to MLRH play beginning with the 2008 MLRH Euro Cup event in July. They announced that Chuck Foster, the 2006 MLRH Coach of the Year, will serve as general manager in assembling the team and continue as head coach.

Seasons and records

Season by season results
Note: GP = Games played, W = Wins, L = Losses, T = Ties, SOL = Shootout Losses, Pts = Points, GF = Goals for, GA = Goals against, PIM = Penalties in minutes

Franchise records
Regular season
Most goals in a season: Dan Scardino, 25 (1998)
Most assists in a season: Mike Vickerman, 25 (1998)
Most points in a season: Dan Scardino, 44 (1998)
Most penalty minutes in a season: Scott Gilligan, 58 (1998)
Most points in a season, defenseman: Dan Costanza, 27 (1998)
Most points in a season, rookie: Dan Scardino, 25 (1998)
Most wins in a season: Matthew Hines, 6 (1998)
Most shutouts in a season: None
Most power play goals in a season: Dan Scardino, 7 (1998)

Playoffs
Most goals in a playoff season:  Dan Scardino, 6 (1998)
Most goals by a defenseman in a playoff season:  Several players tied at 1 (1998)
Most assists in a playoff season:  Dan Costanza, 8 (1998)
Most points in a playoff season:  Dan Scardino, 10 (1998)
Most points by a defenseman in a playoff season:  Dan Costanza, 8 (1998)
Most penalty minutes in a playoff season:  Kurt Walsten, 5 (1998)

Team
Most points in a season: 18, (1998)
Most wins in a season: 9, (1998)
Most goals scored: 138, (1998)
Fewest goals allowed (full season): 216, (1998)
Longest undefeated streak: 3 games, (1998)

Major League Roller Hockey
Laurel, Maryland
Inline hockey teams
Sports clubs in the United States
1998 establishments in Maryland
Sports clubs established in 1998